Israel–Palestine Liberation Organization letters of recognition (or Israel-PLO Recognition or Letters of Mutual Recognition) were a series of official letters of recognition between the government of Israel and its Prime Minister Yitzhak Rabin and the Palestine Liberation Organization's Chairman Yasser Arafat dated September 9, 1993. The letters set the stage for, and were in reality the "preamble" to, the Oslo Accords ("Declaration of Principles On Interim Self-Government Arrangements") of September 13, 1993.

Three letters

There were in fact three letters, with the main points, below:

1: Letter from Yasser Arafat to Prime Minister Rabin

September 9, 1993
Yitzhak Rabin 
Prime Minister of Israel

Mr. Prime Minister, 
The signing of the Declaration of Principles marks a new era...I would like to confirm the following PLO commitments: The PLO recognizes the right of the State of Israel to exist in peace and security. The PLO accepts United Nations Security Council Resolutions 242 and 338. The PLO commits itself...to a peaceful resolution of the conflict between the two sides and declares that all outstanding issues relating to permanent status will be resolved through negotiations...the PLO renounces the use of terrorism and other acts of violence and will assume responsibility over all PLO elements and personnel in order to assure their compliance, prevent violations and discipline violators...the PLO affirms that those articles of the Palestinian Covenant which deny Israel's right to exist, and the provisions of the Covenant which are inconsistent with the commitments of this letter are now inoperative and no longer valid. Consequently, the PLO undertakes to submit to the Palestinian National Council for formal approval the necessary changes in regard to the Palestinian Covenant.

Sincerely, 
Yasser Arafat. 
Chairman: The Palestine Liberation Organization.

2: Letter from Chairman Arafat to Norway's Foreign Minister
September 9, 1993
His Excellency: Johan Jorgen Holst
Foreign Minister of Norway.

Dear Minister Holst,

I would like to confirm to you that, upon the signing of the Declaration of Principles, the PLO encourages and calls upon the Palestinian people in the West Bank and Gaza Strip to take part in the steps leading to the normalization of life, rejecting violence and terrorism, contributing to peace and stability and participating actively in shaping reconstruction, economic development and cooperation.

Sincerely, 
Yasser Arafat. 
Chairman: The Palestine Liberation Organization.

3: Letter from Prime Minister Rabin to Chairman Yasser Arafat
September 9, 1993 
Yasser Arafat 
Chairman: The Palestine Liberation Organization.

Mr. Chairman, 
In response to your letter of September 9, 1993, I wish to confirm to you that, in light of the PLO commitments included in your letter, the Government of Israel has decided to recognize the PLO as the representative of the Palestinian people and commence negotiations with the PLO within the Middle East peace process.

Yitzhak Rabin. 
Prime Minister of Israel.

Additional agreements
Additional Israeli-Palestinian documents related to the Oslo Accords are:

Protocol on Economic Relations, signed in Paris on April 29, 1994,
1994 Cairo Agreement on the Gaza Strip and the Jericho Area (May 4, 1994), 
1994 Washington Declaration (July 25, 1994), 
Agreement on Preparatory Transfer of Powers and Responsibilities Between Israel and the PLO (29 August 1994),
Protocol on Further Transfer of Powers and Responsibilities signed at Cairo on August 27, 1995
Interim Agreement on the West Bank and the Gaza Strip (Oslo 2), (September 28, 1995) 
Protocol Concerning the Redeployment in Hebron (January 15/January 17, 1997)   
Wye River Memorandum (October 23, 1998)
Sharm el-Sheikh Memorandum (September 4, 1999),
Taba Summit (January 27, 2001).

References

External links
Full texts of Israel-PLO recognition letters
Israel-PLO Peace Agreements

Israeli–Palestinian peace process
Palestine Liberation Organization
1993 in Israel
1993 in international relations